Aizaz Ahmad Azar (Punjabi,  c. 1942 – 16 May 2015; sometimes spelled Ezaz or Aizaz Ahmed Azar), also known by his pen name Aizaz, was a Pakistani Urdu, Punjabi poet and writer. Aizaz wrote ten to sixteen books on poetry, including gazals, nazms and several other books on Sufi devotional poems and social issues.

Early life
Aizaz was born in 1942 in Batala, Punjab, British India. He earned a Bachelor of Laws degree from the University of Punjab, and later he obtained a master's degree in Punjabi and was awarded a gold medal. He was possibly an Indian immigrant who later settled in Pakistan following the Partition of India. His initial career in poetry is not known.

Literary work
Aizaz started his poetry work with gazals and nazms, although love, social and other poetic expressions were his mains themes. His prominent poetry include Dhiyan Ki Seerian and Dhoop Ka Rang Gulabi Ho. He is also credited for translating 36th chapter of Quran titled Ya-Sin into Punjabi language. The translated chapter is titled Surah Yousaf ka Jamaliati Jaiza. Aizaz also made his contribution to children's poetry and authored two poems titled Titli (butterfly) and Phool aur Chand (flower and moon), which were later broadcast by Radio Pakistan.

He also wrote a book titled Roshini Misaal which comprises Sufi devotional as well as religious poems, including hamd, naats, manqabat and kafis.

Death
On 15 August 2015, he suffered from a chest pain and died in Lahore, Pakistan. He is buried in Karim Block cemetery of Allama Iqbal Town.

References

External links 
 Aizaz Ahmad Azar profile at Rekhta

1940s births
2015 deaths
Poets from Lahore
20th-century Pakistani poets
21st-century Pakistani poets
Punjabi-language poets
Urdu-language poets from Pakistan
Punjabi people
University of the Punjab alumni